Béatrice Lomeya Atilite is a politician in the Democratic Republic of the Congo.

In August 2019 Lomeya was announced as the Minister for Gender, Family and Children. In  April 2021 she was replaced as minister by Gisèle Ndaya Luseba.

References

Women government ministers of the Democratic Republic of the Congo
Year of birth missing (living people)
Living people
Women's ministers
21st-century Democratic Republic of the Congo women politicians
21st-century Democratic Republic of the Congo politicians